David Ward CBE (3 July 1922 – 16 July 1983) was an opera singer with a bass voice.

Ward was born on 3 July 1922 in Dumbarton, Scotland. During World War II he was in the Royal Navy, and trained at the Royal College of Music under Clive Carey from between 1950 and 1952.

He appeared as a castaway on the BBC Radio programme Desert Island Discs on 29 May 1967, and was made a Commander of the Order of the British Empire (CBE) in 1972.

He sang regularly at the Royal Opera House, Covent Garden, including the role of Wotan in Wagner's Ring Cycle. His commercial recordings are few but include Wotan's Farewell from Die Walküre with the New Philharmonia Orchestra under George Hurst, released in 1971 on Decca PFS 4205.

He died on 16 July 1983 in Dunedin, New Zealand, and was later described by Opera Scotland as "one of the most important Scottish singers of recent decades".

References

External links 
 Opera Scotland profile includes list of major performances
 , Die Walküre, Royal Opera House, Georg Solti, 23 September 1965

1922 births
1983 deaths
20th-century Scottish male opera singers
Operatic basses
Royal Navy personnel of World War II
Alumni of the Royal College of Music
Commanders of the Order of the British Empire